Haider Alo Ali Mohamed (born 25 December 1979) is an Emirati footballer, who played at 2007 AFC Asian Cup.

References

Living people
Emirati footballers
United Arab Emirates international footballers
1979 births
Al Wahda FC players
Emirates Club players
Footballers at the 2002 Asian Games
UAE First Division League players
UAE Pro League players
Association football fullbacks
Asian Games competitors for the United Arab Emirates
2007 AFC Asian Cup players